John Edward Reginald Wyndham, 6th Baron Leconfield, 1st Baron Egremont MBE (5 June 1920 – 6 June 1972) was a British peer, art collector and author.

Career
John Wyndham was the son of Edward Wyndham, 5th Baron Leconfield, and Gladys Mary Farquhar, and a direct descendant of Sir John Wyndham. He  was educated at Eton College and the University of Cambridge.

He served as Private Secretary to Harold Macmillan in various appointments that the latter held between 1940 and 1945, then again in 1955 when Macmillan was Foreign Secretary, and finally during his time as Prime Minister from 1957 to 1963. He was also a Trustee of the Wallace Collection between 1953 and 1972.

In 1963, four years prior to succeeding his father as Baron Leconfield, he was raised to the peerage in his own right in Macmillan's resignation honours as Baron Egremont of Petworth in the County of Sussex. This was a revival of the Egremont title held by his ancestors the earls of Egremont. He and his father took their seats in the House of Lords on the same day.

Marriage and children
Lord Leconfield and Egremont married his second cousin once removed, Pamela Wyndham-Quin (29 April 1925 – 4 November 2013), daughter of the Hon. Valentine Wyndham-Quin and great-granddaughter of the Hon. Blanche Julia Wyndham, (daughter of George Wyndham, 1st Baron Leconfield), in 1947. They had two sons and a daughter, Carlyn.

In 1952, he inherited significant property from his uncle, Charles Wyndham, 3rd Baron Leconfield. He and his bride moved into the magnificent Petworth House in West Sussex.

He died of cancer in June 1972, aged 52, and was succeeded in the baronies by his eldest son Max.  Macmillan wrote the entry on him for the Dictionary of National Biography and dedicated his War Diaries (1984) to him.  Lord Egremont himself wrote an engaging autobiography, Wyndham and Children First (Macmillan, London, 1968) which covers his service with Macmillan in North Africa during the Second World War.

Notes

References
Kidd, Charles, Williamson, David (editors). Debrett's Peerage and Baronetage (1990 edition). New York: St Martin's Press, 1990, 
Thorpe, D.R.  Supermac: the life of Harold Macmillan (2010), p. 687 n. 15.

1920 births
1972 deaths
Members of the Order of the British Empire
People educated at Eton College
John
Hereditary barons created by Elizabeth II